Mehring is a municipality in the Trier-Saarburg district of the Rhineland-Palatinate, Germany.

References

Municipalities in Rhineland-Palatinate
Trier-Saarburg